In typography, spacing may refer to:
 Letter spacing
 Word spacing
 Sentence spacing
 Space (punctuation)

See also
 Rivers of white
 Word divider